Guillermo Angulo Luciano (June 25, 1902 – August 22, 1979) was a Puerto Rican first baseman in the Negro leagues.

A native of Carolina, Puerto Rico, Angulo played for the Cuban Stars (East) in 1929. In his three recorded games, he posted one hit in 13 plate appearances. Angulo died in his hometown of Carolina in 1979 at age 77.

References

External links
 and Seamheads

1902 births
1979 deaths
Cuban Stars (East) players
Puerto Rican baseball players
Baseball first basemen
People from Carolina, Puerto Rico